Highway 108 (AR 108, Ark. 108, and Hwy. 108) is a state highway composed of two segments in the southwestern corner of the U.S. state of Arkansas.  The northern segment begins as a continuation of State Highway 87 near the extreme southeastern corner of Oklahoma.  The northern segment ends at U.S. Highway 59 and U.S. Highway 71 at Ashdown.  The southern segment begins  to the south along US 59 / US 71, at the Texas state line.  The route ends at U.S. Highway 67 northeast of Texarkana.

Route description

The Northern segment of Highway 108 begins at the Oklahoma state line as a continuation of State Highway 87.  It heads to the northeast through Little River County towards Foreman.  On the southern edge of Foreman, a spur route, Highway 108S, splits off to the south to intersect Highway 32 / Highway 41 and Highway 108 turns to the north.  At Highway 32, which is Tracy Lawrence Avenue at this location, Highway 108 turns to the east and follows Highway 32.  At Highway 41, known as Madden Street in Foreman, Highway 32 turns to the south and Highway 108 continues east.

East of Foreman, Highway 108 continues to the northeast towards Alleene.  South of Alleene, the route intersects Highway 234 at a four-way stop.  All traffic at this intersection must turn to stay on the same numbered route; Highway 108 represents the western and southern branches and Highway 234 represents the northern and eastern branches.  Now heading south and east, Highway 108 travels  to U.S. Highway 59 / U.S. Highway 71 north of Ashdown.

The southern segment of Highway 108, in Miller County, serves as a northern bypass of Texarkana.  It intersects Interstate 30 at its exit 7.  One half-mile (0.8 km) later, Highway 108 ends at U.S. Highway 67.

Major intersections

Foreman spur

Highway 108 Spur (AR 108S, Ark. 108S, and Hwy. 108S) is a short, east–west highway in Little River County in southwest Arkansas.

See also

 List of state highways in Arkansas

References

External links

108
Transportation in Little River County, Arkansas
Transportation in Miller County, Arkansas